Slivje may refer to:
 Slivje, Dolneni, North Macedonia
 Slivje (Svrljig), Serbia